Xanthaciura phoenicura is a species of tephritid or fruit flies in the genus Xanthaciura of the family Tephritidae.

Distribution
Mexico South to Peru & Brazil.

References

Tephritinae
Insects described in 1873
Diptera of South America
Diptera of North America